George-Marios Angeletos (born in 1975, Athens, Greece) is a Greek economist who is a Professor of Economics at Northwestern University. He was previously a Professor of Economics at the Massachusetts Institute of Technology (MIT).

Angeletos was born in Athens, Greece. He earned his B.A. degree in Economics from Athens University of Economics and Business in 1996, and received his M.Sc. in Economics in 1997 from the same university. Angeletos earned his Ph.D in Economics in 2001 from Harvard. Angeletos received a scholarship from the Alexander S. Onassis Foundation to complete his doctorate. After graduating from Harvard, Angeletos became a member of the MIT faculty, and was awarded tenure there in 2007. In 2006, Angeletos received a Sloan Fellowship, awarded by the Alfred P. Sloan Foundation. Shortly after receiving tenure, Angeletos won the Bodossaki Foundation Prize in Social Sciences for distinguished young Greek scientists in 2008. During 2013-14, Angeletos held the Chair of Macroeconomics and Finance at the University of Zurich.

Angeletos has published many articles in the field of macroeconomics. In particular, much of his research has investigated the impact of informational frictions in macro settings. He has made many notable contributions to the field of global games, which followed the work of Stephen Morris and Hung Song Shin. More recently, his work has focused on the roles of expectations, information, and bounded rationality in the business cycle.

References

Sources 
 George-Marios Angeletos, Christian Hellwig, and Alessandro Pavan (2006), "Signaling in a Global Game: Coordination and Policy Traps," Journal of Political Economy, 114 (3), 452-484.
 George-Marios Angeletos, Christian Hellwig, and Alessandro Pavan (2007), "Dynamic Global Games of Regime Change: Learning, Multiplicity and Timing of Attacks," Econometrica, 75 (3), 711-756.
 George-Marios Angeletos and Ivan Werning (2006), "Crises and Prices: Information Aggregation, Multiplicity, and Volatility," American Economic Review, 96 (5), 1720–36.
 George-Marios Angeletos and Alessandro Pavan (2007), "Efficient Use of Information and Social Value of Information," Econometrica, 75 (4).
 Stephen Morris and Hyun Song Shin (1998), "Unique Equilibrium in a Model of Self-Fulfilling Currency Attacks," American Economic Review, 88 (3), 587–97.

External links 
 webpage at MIT
 NBER working papers by Angeletos

1975 births
Living people
Academic staff of the University of Zurich
MIT School of Humanities, Arts, and Social Sciences faculty
Harvard Graduate School of Arts and Sciences alumni
21st-century Greek economists
Macroeconomists
Greek emigrants to the United States
Writers from Athens
Athens University of Economics and Business alumni
Fellows of the Econometric Society
Fellows of the European Economic Association